The Maya Award for Best Feature Film is one of the Maya Awards presented annually since the awards debuted in 2012, that is initiated by FILM_Indonesia Twitter account. Best Feature Film is the final award at every Maya Awards ceremony.

The nominations and winners of the awards are selected by a panel of judges consisting of Indonesian film critics and filmmakers, including directors, actors, and actresses.

Winners and nominees
For the first ceremony of the award, eight films were nominated. The number expanded to ten films the following year before being dropped back to eight films from the third ceremony until now.

2010s

References

Maya Awards (Indonesia)